The Suite in G Minor, BWV 995, was transcribed for lute by composer Johann Sebastian Bach between the spring of 1727 and the winter of 1731 from his own Cello Suite No. 5, BWV 1011. It is in six movements:

Präludium – Très Vite
Allemande
Courante
Sarabande
Gavotte I – Gavotte II En Rondeaux
Gigue

The sources for this are: an autograph manuscript by Bach, in staff notation on two staves (B-Br Ms.II 4085 MUSI.); and a version in lute tablature made from it by an unnamed lutenist (D-LEm Sammlung Becker, Ms. III.11.3).

Notes

External links
 

Suites by Johann Sebastian Bach
Compositions in G minor